The discography of K3, a Flemish-Dutch pop group, consists of 21 studio albums, one live album, eight compilation albums, three musical soundtrack albums and 42 singles. Their debut album Parels was released in 1999 and peaked at 2 in the Flemish album chart. Their next singles and albums all became big hits in the Netherlands and Belgium.

Albums

Studio albums

Live albums

Compilation albums

Soundtrack albums

Singles

Other charted songs

Notes

References

External links
 Official site K3 (Dutch)
 Official Fanclub/Forum (Dutch)
 Official site Studio 100 (Dutch)
 Official site Studio 100 (English)
 
 
 
 
 
 
 
 

Discographies of Belgian artists
Pop music group discographies